The Refinitiv Business Classification (TRBC) is an industry classification of global companies. It was developed by the Reuters Group under the name Reuters Business Sector Scheme (RBSS), was rebranded to Thomson Reuters Business Classification (TRBC) when the Thomson Corporation acquired the Reuters Group in 2008, forming Thomson Reuters, and was rebranded again, to The Refinitiv Business Classification (TRBC), in 2020. Since the creation of Refinitiv in October 2018, TRBC has been owned and operated by Refinitiv and is the basis for Refinitiv Indices.

Market-based classification 
TRBC is a market-based classification scheme, similar to the GICS and ICB systems. These classify companies on the basis of degree of impact on markets, rather than establishment-based classification systems such as the North American Industry Classification System (NAICS).

Use
TRBC is used primarily in the Financial Investment and Advisory space, where investors identify and select groups of comparable companies and look at trends. More specifically, this could be Investment Managers allocating funds and benchmarking their portfolios; Investment Bankers highlighting acquisition targets and opportunities for financial restructuring, or more generally corporates performing competitive analysis of their peers in the marketplace.

Coverage 
TRBC covers over 72,000 public companies in 130 countries and provides a classification history going back to 1999.

Versions 
Four versions of the classification scheme have been published: RBSS 2004, TRBC 2008, TRBC 2012 and TRBC 2020. The first two versions had four levels: Economic sectors, Business sectors, Industry groups, and Industries. The third version added a fifth level, Activities.

Structure 

The TRBC classification scheme has a five-level hierarchical structure:

 13 Economic sectors
 33 Business sectors
 62 Industry groups
 154 Industries
 898 Activities

Classification scheme 
The TRBC classification scheme is shown below.

Note that the acronym NEC stands for "not elsewhere classified". The use of this acronym, with the same meaning, is common in classification schemes, for example the Standard Industrial Classification (SIC) uses it.

See also
 Global Industry Classification Standard (GICS)
 Industry Classification Benchmark (ICB)
 North American Industry Classification System (NAICS)
 Standard Industrial Classification (SIC)
 Statistical Classification of Economic Activities in the European Community (NACE)
 Industry classification

External links
 Thomson Reuters Business Classification
 Thomson Reuters Business Classification in Excel

References

Industry classifications
Financial markets
Indexes
Thomson Reuters